Jamal Abu Samhadana (8 February 1963 – 8 June 2006), from Rafah in the Gaza Strip, was the founder and leader of the Popular Resistance Committees (which have been held responsible for firing missiles into Israel), a former Fatah and Tanzim member, and number two on Israel's list of wanted terrorists.

Abu Samhadana survived an Israeli missile strike in the Gaza Strip in December 2004, but was killed by the Israeli Air Force on 8 June 2006.

Appointment as chief of Executive Force 
On 20 April 2006, Abu Samhadana was appointed Director General of the Executive Force, a new security forces in Gaza, by Said Seyam, Interior Minister of the Palestinian National Authority's  new Hamas-led government. Abu Samhadana was quoted as saying that "We have only one enemy. They are Jews. We have no other enemy. I will continue to carry the rifle and pull the trigger whenever required to defend my people."

The appointment "sparked new criticism from the U.S. and Israel and intensified the struggle for control of some 70,000 Palestinian security forces" between Hamas and President Mahmoud Abbas. Abbas subsequently issued a decree banning the formation of the Executive Force that Abu Samhadana was to have headed.<ref>Conal Urquhart, Palestinian president vetoes Hamas police, The Guardian, 22 April 2006.</ref>  However, Hamas defied the President's decree and proceeded with the nomination and the formation of the force.

Assassination
Although Israel acknowledged that Hamas was largely sticking to a ceasefire, on 8 June 2006, he was assassinated, along with at least three other PRC members, by four missiles fired by Israeli Apache helicopters, guided by Israeli reconnaissance drones, at a PRC camp in Rafah.

Repercussions of the assassination
At his funeral Samhadana’s supporters called for revenge. Hours after his assassination rockets were fired at Sderot in Israel. The IDF retaliated by bombarding the launch sites on a Gaza beach. During the bombardment period, the civilian Ghalia family was all but wiped out in an explosion. Analysts trace the Samhadana assassination to the rocket fire (on Sderot), through a series of IDF shellings, rocket attacks and commando raids on Gaza that killed over three dozen people, mostly civilians, to the capture of Israeli Corporal Gilad Shalit on June 25. Two days after Shalit's capture, the IDF launched Operation Summer Rains killing over 400 Palestinians and wounding 650.

References

External links
On Patrol with the Killer Israel Dreads Hala Jaber, Sunday Times, 29 December 2002.

Video
Hamas sets out vision for future, BBC News Online'', 27 March 2006.

1963 births
2006 deaths
Palestinian militants
Deaths by Israeli airstrikes
Assassinated Palestinian politicians
People from Rafah Governorate
People killed by Israeli security forces